The Atlantic Plain is one of eight distinct physiographic regions of the United States. The Atlantic Plain of the United States includes portions of the coastal states of Delaware, Florida, Georgia, Maryland, Massachusetts, New Jersey, New York, North Carolina, South Carolina, and Virginia.

The lands adjacent to the Atlantic coastline are made up of sandy beaches, marshlands, bays, and barrier islands. This major division consists of the continental shelf and coastal plain physiographic provinces. The central and southern Atlantic Coast is characterized by barrier and drowned valley coasts. The coastal Atlantic plain features nearly continuous barriers interrupted by inlets, large embayments with drowned river valleys, and extensive wetlands and marshes. The Atlantic plain slopes gently seaward from the inland highlands in a series of terraces. This gentle slope continues far into the Atlantic and Gulf of Mexico, forming the continental shelf. The relief at the land-sea interface is so low that the boundary between them is often blurry and indistinct, especially along stretches of the Louisiana bayous and the Florida Everglades.

Coastal Plains

This province consists of the following physiographic sections: the Embayed, Sea Island, Floridian, East Gulf Coastal Plain, Mississippi Alluvial Plain, and the West Gulf Coastal Plain. The rocks consist for the most part of layers of sand and clay which are not yet hardened into sandstone and shale. The coastal Atlantic plain features nearly continuous barriers interrupted by inlets, large embayments with drowned river valleys, and extensive wetlands and marshes. The Atlantic plain slopes gently seaward from the inland highlands in a series of terraces. The surface is mainly flat, with a very great population. The increase in population affects the wildlife immensely.  

It extends  from the New York Bight southward to a Georgia/Florida section of the Eastern Continental Divide, which demarcates the plain from the ACF River Basin in the Gulf Coastal Plain to the west. The province is bordered on the west by the Atlantic Seaboard Fall Line and the Piedmont plateau, to the east by the Atlantic Ocean, and to the south by the Floridian province. The Outer Lands archipelagic region forms the insular northeasternmost extension of the Atlantic coastal plain.  

The province's average elevation is less than 900 meters above sea level and extends some 50 to 100 kilometers inland from the ocean.  The coastal plain is normally  wet, including many rivers, marsh, and swampland.  It is composed primarily of sedimentary rock and unlithified sediments and is primarily used for agriculture.  The Atlantic Coastal Plain includes the Carolina Sandhills region as well as the Embayed and Sea Island physiographic provinces.  The Atlantic Coastal Plain is sometimes subdivided into northern and southern regions, specifically the Mid-Atlantic and South Atlantic coastal plains.

Geology
The Atlantic Plain is generally gently dipping undeformed Mesozoic and Cenozoic sediments, with the sedimentary wedge thickening toward the sea, reaching a maximum thickness of about 3 kilometers (10,000 ft) in the vicinity of Cape Hatteras, North Carolina.

Ecology

Flora 

Despite being previously overlooked in research, the Atlantic Coastal Plain is now identified as a global biodiversity hotspot, with over 1500 endemic plant species, and ~70% habitat loss. This endemism is particularly high in the longleaf pine savannas and woodlands, along with the other herbaceous and fire dependent ecosystems of the ecoregion. Despite intermittent flooding, certain refugia have remained continuously terrestrial since at least the late Cretaceous (85-80mya), contributing to endemism. Generally speaking, despite the high diversity of soils, the soil is nutrient poor. This is primarily due to an abundance of well-drained soils, creating a primarily xeric character to the floral makeup of the Atlantic Plain. However, waterlogged soils are also notable, with wetlands and hammocks being important ecological features.

The Eastern woodlands are the original, predominant ecosystem of the Atlantic coastal plain. The Atlantic coastal plain upland longleaf pine woodland is an endemic plant community found in most of the Atlantic coastal plain, ranging from Virginia to northern Florida. These woodland savannas are reliant on sandy soils and are fire dependent, lest hardwoods start to dominate. Alongside longleaf pine, typically associated flora includes turkey oak and wiregrass. The Florida longleaf pine sandhill extends the longleaf pine forests into central Florida, with South Florida slash pine flatwoods, Florida sand pine scrub and Florida dry prairie stretching into southern Florida. Longleaf pine woodlands also stretch further west, to eastern Texas. These comprise of East Gulf & West Gulf longleaf pine flatwoods, bisected by the Mississippi Alluvial Plain.

To the north, the Atlantic Coastal Plain also broaches into the mesic hardwood forests of the Middle Atlantic coastal forests, followed by the northern Atlantic coastal pine barrens. The southernmost Atlantic Plain contains the only Neotropical ecoregion of the continental USA, being the Everglades and Florida mangroves.

Fauna 
The following species are largely endemic to the region. Amphibian diversity is especially notable in the Atlantic Plain.

North 

 Pine Barrens tree frog (Dryophytes andersonii)
 Northern red-bellied cooter (Pseudemys rubriventris)
 Heath hen (Tympanuchus cupido cupido) EX
 Beach vole (Microtus breweri)
 Red wolf (Canis rufus)

South 

Some of these species' ranges may extend into the longleaf pine woodlands and savannas of the Gulf Plain.

 Red-cockaded woodpecker (Picoides borealis)
 Brown-headed nuthatch (Sitta pusilla)
 Bachman's sparrow (Peucaea aestivalis)
 Florida scrub jay (Aphelocoma coerulescens)
 Ivory-billed woodpecker (Campephilus principalis) EX
 American alligator (Alligator mississippiensis)
 Gopher tortoise (Gopherus polyphemus)
 Chicken turtle (Deirochelys reticularia)
 Florida worm lizard (Rhineura floridana)
 Eastern indigo snake (Drymarchon couperi)
 Eastern diamondback rattlesnake (Crotalus adamanteus)
 Southeastern pocket gopher (Geomys pinetis)
 Round-tailed muskrat (Neofiber alleni)
 Two-toed amphiuma (Amphiuma means)
 Oak toad (Anaxyrus quercicus)
 Frosted flatwoods salamander (Ambystoma cingulatum)
 Striped newt (Notophthalmus perstriatus)

References

Physiographic regions of the United States
Geography of the United States